The riffle minnow (Phenacobius catostomus) is a North American species of cyprinid freshwater fish. It inhabits riffles in warm streams of medium to large size, in the states of Alabama, Georgia, and Tennessee, above the Fall Line. The riffle minnow is olive on top, and white below.

This fish is not to be confused with Alburnoides bipunctatus, which is also known as riffle minnow, but lives in Europe and Asia.

References

Phenacobius
Freshwater fish of the United States
Fish described in 1877
Taxa named by David Starr Jordan